Married Bachelor is a 1941 American comedy film directed by Edward Buzzell. It stars actors Robert Young and Ruth Hussey.

Plot summary

Cast
 Robert Young as Randolph 'Randy' Haven
 Ruth Hussey as Norma Haven, aka Norma Winters 
 Felix Bressart as Prof. Ladislaus Milic 
 Lee Bowman as Eric Santley 
 Sheldon Leonard as Johnny Branigan
 Sam Levene as Cookie Farrrar

References

External links
 
 
 
 

1941 films
1941 comedy films
American black-and-white films
American comedy films
1940s English-language films
Films directed by Edward Buzzell
Films scored by Lennie Hayton
Films set in New York City
Metro-Goldwyn-Mayer films
1940s American films